Donald Eric Capps (January 30, 1939 – August 26, 2015) was an American theologian and William Harte Felmeth Professor of Pastoral Theology at Princeton Theological Seminary.

Biography
Donald Eric Capps was born in Omaha, Nebraska. After studying at Lewis & Clark College (B.A. 1960) and Yale Divinity School (B.D. 1963, S.T.M. 1965) and University of Chicago (M.A. 1966), he earned his Ph.D. also at the University of Chicago in 1970. His dissertation explored a psycho-historical analysis of the personality of the English theologian John Henry Cardinal Newman, and particularly his vocational struggles.

Capps' academic career started as Instructor at the Department of Religious Studies at the Oregon State University during the Spring/Summer of 1969. He then became Instructor and Assistant Professor at the Divinity School of the University of Chicago between 1969 and 1974. Later, he was appointed Associate Professor at the Department of Religious Studies of the University of North Carolina at Charlotte, North Carolina where he lectured between 1974 and 1976. Between 1976 and 1981 he was Associate Professor and then Professor at the Graduate Seminary of Phillips University.

In 1981 he joined the faculty of Princeton Theological Seminary, where he was appointed the William Harte Felmeth Professor of Pastoral Theology. In May 2009 he retired with the status of Professor emeritus but remained lecturing as adjunct until his death. In 1989 Uppsala University, Sweden awarded him a degree of Doctor honoris causa in Theology for his contributions to the field of Psychology of Religion.

Other honors include the William F. Bier Award for contribution to Psychology of Religion, granted in 1995 by the Division 36 of the American Psychological Association; the Helen Flanders Dunbar Centennial Award, granted in 2002 by the Columbia-Presbyterian Hospital in New York; and the Joseph A. Sittler Award for Theological Leadership, granted in 2003 by Trinity Lutheran Seminary.

He was the book review editor for the Journal for the Scientific Study of Religion between 1980 and 1983 and editor for the same journal between 1983 and 1988. Furthermore, between 1990 and 1992 he was the president of the Society for the Scientific Study of Religion. He was an ordained minister of the Evangelical Lutheran Church in America beginning in 1972.

Capps died on August 26, 2015, in Trenton, New Jersey, as a consequence of injuries suffered in a car crash in Princeton.

Selected bibliography
Capps wrote, co-authored, edited and co-edited dozens of books and journal issues and published more than one hundred chapters, articles, and reviews in books and journals.

Books

 New Preface

 New Preface

Edited books and journal issues

 With Robert C. Dykstra
 With Robert C. Dykstra
 With Robert C. Dykstra

Selected book chapters and journal articles

 Translation of the doctoral (University of Uppsala) inaugural lecture.

 With Nathan Steven Carlin

 The 1994 William F. Bier Award Address of Division 36 of the American Psychological Association. 

 Inaugural address at Princeton Theological Seminary.

Secondary resources

 Selection, introduction and translation of previously published book chapters and articles by the editor. Afterword by Donald Capps.

References

1939 births
2015 deaths
American theologians
Lewis & Clark College alumni
Yale Divinity School alumni
University of Chicago Divinity School alumni
Writers from Omaha, Nebraska
Princeton Theological Seminary faculty
Phillips University faculty
Road incident deaths in New Jersey
Psychologists of religion